The Kodak Z712 IS ZOOM digital camera is a high-end consumer digital camera.
It features a 12x optical Schneider-Kreuznach zoom lens.

The Kodak Z712 is the successor to the popular Z612 which was the model before it. The Kodak Z712 is in a class of cameras known as "Super Zooms." 
The Z712 features 12x zoom. Along with that it comes with manual options to adjust the shutter speed and aperture.

See also
List of products manufactured by Kodak

External links 
 Review on CNET
 Kodak's Official site for the Z712 IS

Z712 IS